Kabhi Andhera Kabhi Ujala is a 1958 Hindi film starring Kishore Kumar and Nutan.

Soundtrack

References

External links
 

1958 films
1950s Hindi-language films
Films scored by O. P. Nayyar